Ultimate Fighting Championship (UFC) champions are fighters who have won UFC championships.

Historical notes
At the time of the UFC's inception in 1993, mixed martial arts was not sanctioned in the United States, and did not include weight classes. Instead of the traditional championship model, the UFC held tournaments with the winner receiving a permanent appellation. In response to criticism from Senator John McCain that saw the loss of its television deal and the banning of the sport in thirty-six states, the UFC increased its cooperation with state athletic commissions and introduced weight classes in 1997, starting with UFC 12, and began introducing weight-specific titles.

The original codification for weight classes introduced only two divisions: heavyweight, which grouped together all competitors above , and lightweight, which encompassed all competitors 199 pounds (90 kg) and under. At UFC 14 the lightweight division would be renamed to middleweight, though it would still encompass all fighters 199 pounds (90 kg) and under. The lightweight moniker would later return at UFC 16 with a new division consisting of those competitors  and under. Two years later a fourth weight class, the bantamweight division, arrived at UFC 26 and included all fighters  and under.

In 2000, the New Jersey State Athletic Control Board completely took over MMA regulation in its home state and developed new rules and weight classes that eventually became the de facto rule set for all mixed martial arts. The UFC realigned their weight classes to comply with these new regulations in 2001, beginning with UFC 31. At the time, this brought the total number of active divisions in the UFC to five: lightweight, welterweight, middleweight, light heavyweight, and heavyweight.

It would be nearly ten years before the UFC would expand their divisional offerings to include any of the lower weight classes. The first additions came in late 2010 when the UFC merged with their sister organization World Extreme Cagefighting (WEC). Due to the WEC's focus on lighter weight fighters, this merger necessitated the addition of both the featherweight and bantamweight divisions to the UFC, starting with The Ultimate Fighter season 12 finale. In early 2012 the UFC decided they would delve even further into the lower weight classes when they announced the introduction of the flyweight division to their ranks, beginning with UFC on FX: Alves vs. Kampmann.

In November 2012, as a result of the forthcoming dissolution of their sister organization Strikeforce, the UFC announced they would be adding female fighters to their roster for the first time in the promotion's history. Initially, only the women's bantamweight division was brought over, with the division's premiere bout taking place at UFC 157. A little over a year later, the UFC announced they would be expanding their weight classes for female fighters with the addition of a women's strawweight division, the first bout took place at UFC Fight Night: Cowboy vs. Miller.
In late 2016, a featherweight division was introduced for the women with the first bout to be for the inaugural championship at UFC 208 on February 11, 2017. In that same year the UFC announced the Women's Flyweight division would officially be added, with the winner of the 26th season of The Ultimate Fighter to be named the inaugural champion.

Current champions

Men

Women

Men's championship history

Heavyweight Championship 
206 to 265 lb (93 to 120 kg)
The UFC Superfight Championship was unified with the UFC 11 Tournament Championship to determine the inaugural UFC Heavyweight Champion on February 7, 1997, when Mark Coleman defeated Dan Severn at UFC 12.

Light Heavyweight Championship
186 to 205 lb (84 to 93 kg)
The Light Heavyweight Championship was known as the Middleweight Championship prior to UFC 31 (May 4, 2001).
The Pride World Middleweight Championship (205.03 lb) was unified with the UFC Light Heavyweight Championship on September 8, 2007, when Quinton Jackson defeated Dan Henderson at UFC 75.

Middleweight Championship
171 to 185 lb (78 to 84 kg)
The Pride World Welterweight Championship (182.98 lb) was unified with the UFC Middleweight Championship on March 1, 2008, when Anderson Silva defeated Dan Henderson at UFC 82.

Welterweight Championship
156 to 170 lb (71 to 77 kg)
The Welterweight Championship was known as the Lightweight Championship prior to UFC 31 (May 4, 2001).

Lightweight Championship
146 to 155 lb (66 to 70 kg)
The Lightweight Championship was known as the Bantamweight Championship prior to UFC 31 (May 4, 2001).
The Strikeforce Lightweight Championship was unified (perhaps unofficially) with the UFC Lightweight Championship on April 20, 2013, when Benson Henderson defeated Gilbert Melendez at UFC on Fox: Henderson vs. Melendez.

Featherweight Championship
136 to 145 lb (61 to 66 kg)
Prior to the UFC-WEC merger, José Aldo was the WEC Featherweight Champion. Aldo was awarded the inaugural UFC Featherweight Championship on November 20, 2010, at UFC 123 in a ceremony prior to the event.

Bantamweight Championship
126 to 135 lb (57 to 61 kg)
Prior to UFC-WEC merger, Dominick Cruz was the WEC Bantamweight Champion. At WEC 53, Cruz defeated Scott Jorgensen to retain the WEC Bantamweight Championship and was awarded the inaugural UFC Bantamweight Championship.

Flyweight Championship
116 to 125 lb (53 to 57 kg)
Demetrious Johnson defeated Joseph Benavidez on September 22, 2012, at UFC 152 in Toronto, Ontario, Canada in the finale of a four-man tournament for the inaugural title.

Women's championship history

Women's Featherweight Championship
136 to 145 lb (62 to 66 kg)
The inaugural title was contested on February 11, 2017, in Brooklyn, NY, US at UFC 208.

Women's Bantamweight Championship
126 to 135 lb (57 to 61 kg)
Prior to its folding and absorption by the UFC, Ronda Rousey was the Strikeforce Women's Bantamweight Champion. Rousey was awarded the inaugural UFC Women's Bantamweight Championship on December 6, 2012, at a UFC on Fox: Henderson vs. Diaz pre-event press conference.

Women's Flyweight Championship
116 to 125 lb (53 to 57 kg)
The inaugural title was contested on December 1, 2017, in Las Vegas, NV, US at The Ultimate Fighter: A New World Champion Finale. The inaugural title fight was between two fighters who appeared on the 26th season of The Ultimate Fighter.

Women's Strawweight Championship
106 to 115 lb (48 to 52 kg)
Previously the Invicta FC Strawweight Champion, Carla Esparza defeated Rose Namajunas for the inaugural title on December 12, 2014, in the tournament finale of The Ultimate Fighter: A Champion Will Be Crowned.

Defunct title

Superfight Championship
The openweight title used before the introduction of weight classes in 1997. It was designed to create a reigning UFC champion for the UFC tournament winners to challenge.

Tournament winners

The Ultimate Fighter
The Ultimate Fighter (TUF) is a reality television series and mixed martial arts competition produced by the UFC. The show features professional fighters living together and competing against one another in a tournament for a contract with the UFC.

Champions by nationality
Division champions are the primary separation criteria due to being non-closed competition. It includes title holders and interim title holders. Interim champions who become undisputed champions are listed only once. People with multiple title reigns will have each of them counted. Tournament wins are secondary due to many tournaments being country-specific and thus not generally a national achievement to win. Runners-up and TUF runners-up are not included.

TUF winners by nationality

Most wins in title bouts
Fighters with four or more championship and/or interim championship title wins. Fighters with the same number of title wins are arranged in order of most title fights. Tournament championships and TUF winners are not included.

Most consecutive title defenses
The following includes all UFC champions who were able to consecutively defend their title three times or more. Fighters with the same number of title defenses are listed chronologically.

 Bold — Incumbent champion.

Longest reigning champions
The following is a list of the ten longest reigning UFC champions.

Longest individual reigns

Longest combined reigns

 Bold — Incumbent champion.

Multi-division champions
Fighters who have won championships in multiple weight classes. Tournament championships and TUF winners are not included.

Randy Couture is notably the first champion to hold belts in two different divisions, and one of the few to reclaim a title after being defeated. Conor McGregor was the first fighter to hold multiple titles simultaneously.

Simultaneous two division champions
 Note: Defenses shown are while champion was a two division champion.

 Bold - Active reigns.

Missed weight title fights
There have been multiple instances in UFC history where a fighter misses the required weight limit for a championship fight. The following fights were originally scheduled and advertised as title fights, with the contenders earning a title shot, but due to a fighter missing weight these fights took place, only one fighter was eligible for the title, or the fight was changed to a non-title fight.

See also
 List of current mixed martial arts champions
 List of current UFC fighters
 List of Pride Fighting Championships champions
 List of Strikeforce champions
 List of UFC events
 List of UFC records
 List of World Extreme Cagefighting champions
 Mixed martial arts weight classes

References

External links
 Current Title Holders at UFC.com

Champions

UFC champions
UFC Champions, List Of